

Fairchild is a common surname derived from the Old English words for fair or beautiful and the word child. Originally a given name, early records of its use as a surname are found in Oxfordshire, Surrey and Sussex.

List of persons with the surname

 Fairchild family, descendants of Thomas Fairchild (1610–1670), son of William Fairchild (b.1577 in Essex England)

A
 Alexa Fairchild (born 1994), Belgian equestrian athlete 
Amy Fairchild, American historian

B
 Barbara Fairchild, American country and gospel singer/songwriter
 Benjamin L. Fairchild (1863–1946), New York State Republican congressman

C
 Cassius Fairchild (1829–1868), Wisconsin Democratic Party Leader and Union Army colonel, U.S. Civil War
 Charles S. Fairchild (1842–1924), New York State Attorney General, 38th United States Secretary of Treasury

D
 David Fairchild (1869–1954), industrial botanist, plant explorer, son-in-law of Alexander Graham Bell
 David Fairchild (California politician) (1791–1866)

E
 Edward Henry Fairchild (1815–1889), abolishionist educator, first President of Berea College
 Edward T. Fairchild (Wisconsin associate justice) (1872–1965), jurist, Wisconsin Supreme Court
 Edward Thomson Fairchild (1854–1917), New Hampshire College of Agriculture and Mechanical Arts (U. of New Hampshire) president
 Edwin C. Fairchild (1874–1955), British socialist activist

F
 Frank Wesbrook (1868–1918), first University of British Columbia president
 Fred Rogers Fairchild (1877–1966), American educator and economist

G
 George Thompson Fairchild (1838–1901), college educator, president of Michigan State University and Kansas State University
 George Winthrop Fairchild (1854–1924), American politician, and co-founder of IBM
 Graham Fairchild (1906–1994), entomologist, grandson of Alexander Graham Bell

H
 Henry Pratt Fairchild (1880–1956), American sociologist, co-founder of Planned Parenthood
 Herman LeRoy Fairchild (1850–1943), American geologist and college educator, early proponent of theorizing meteorite impact
 Hiram Orlando Fairchild (1845–1925), speaker of the Wisconsin State Assembly

J
 James Fairchild (1817–1902), president of Oberlin College
 Jim Fairchild American singer/songwriter guitarist, Band member of Modest Mouse
 Jairus C. Fairchild (1801–1862), first Wisconsin State Treasurer, and first mayor of Madison, Wisconsin
 John Fairchild, American basketball player

K
 Karen Fairchild, singer in American Country band, Little Big Town
 Kelly Fairchild, American ice hockey player

L
 LeRoy Fairchild, founded the Masonic order, the Mystic Order of Veiled Prophets of the Enchanted Realm in 1889
 Lucius Fairchild (1831–1896), Civil War Brigadier General, three-term Governor of Wisconsin, U.S. Minister to Spain, Commander-in-Chief of the Grand Army of the Republic
 Lydia Fairchild, one of only 30 known worldwide cases of chimerism

M
 Megan Fairchild, American ballet dancer
 Morgan Fairchild, American actress
 Muir S. Fairchild (1894–1950), Four-star General, Vice Chief of Staff of the United States Air Force

R
 Robert Fairchild, American ballet dancer

S
 Sherman Fairchild (1896–1971), industrialist inventor, founder of Fairchild Aviation, Fairchild-Strato, Fairchild-Hiller, Fairchild Recording, and Fairchild Camera and Instrument
 Stuart Fairchild (born 1996), American baseball player

T
 Thomas E. Fairchild (1912–2007), Wisconsin Attorney General, appointed to Wisconsin Supreme Court and U.S. 7th Circuit Court of Appeals

Characters 

 Miss Fairchild : From 'Hearts and Hands' by O. Henry
 Caitlin Fairchild : From Prime Earth, DC Comics
 Nikki Fairchild : From the Stark trilogy by J Kenner
 Fairchild family : From Shadowhunters (Netflix show)

References

English-language surnames
Surnames of English origin